Robert Morrison (30 August 1869 – 12 July 1891) was a footballer who played as a defender for Linfield and the Ireland national team.

Born in Greenock in Scotland, Morrison's family moved to Belfast in Ireland when he was an infant. He played in Linfield's double-winning team which claimed the Irish Cup and the first edition of the Irish League in the 1890–91 season. His standard of play led to him being selected for Ireland in two British Home Championship fixtures in early 1891, a 7–2 home win over Wales followed by a 6–1 away defeat to England. However, he contracted pneumonia and died from the illness in July of that year, aged 21.

His younger brother Tommy was also an Ireland international and played for clubs including Burnley, Celtic and Manchester United; another brother Alex played for Glentoran.

References

1869 births
1891 deaths
Footballers from Greenock
Association footballers from Belfast
Irish association footballers (before 1923)
Scottish footballers
Irish League representative players
Association football defenders
Linfield F.C. players
Pre-1950 IFA international footballers
NIFL Premiership players
Deaths from pneumonia in the United Kingdom